My Flesh and Blood is a 2003 documentary film by Jonathan Karsh chronicling a year in the life of the Tom family. The Tom family is notable as the mother, Susan Tom, adopted eleven children, most of whom had serious disabilities or diseases. It was nominated for and won several awards, including the Audience Award and the Director's Award at the Sundance Film Festival.

Plot
The documentary takes an in-depth look at the Tom family, which mostly consists of children who were rejected by their birth families due to mental or physical disabilities. The film is broken up into seasons, starting out with the family taking part in Halloween in the fall, and ending in the summer of the upcoming year. The family's unconventional home life becomes a foundation for the supports, challenges, and successes that they face daily.

People 
 Susan Tom, adoptive mother of the children
 Faith Tom, who survived severe burns as an infant in a crib fire. Faith believes that when she gets older, she will look like "regular people" and emotionally invests in the promises of her plastic surgeons.
 Joe Tom, who has cystic fibrosis and is in the last stages of the disease. Susan and Joe's doctors know that his death is imminent, but, as is common with terminally ill kids, withholds the prognosis from Joe who seems to believe that he will live to be an adult. 
 Xenia Tom, who was born without legs. The condition is referred to as  congenital amputation.
 Margaret Tom, who has no severe disabilities and assists her mother.
 Anthony Tom, who has recessive dystrophic epidermolysis bullosa. Unlike Joe, he is aware that he has a terminal illness.

There are six other children of whom viewers do not see as much due to the constraints of keeping the film to a reasonable length.

Reception

Awards

Received
Amsterdam International Documentary Film Festival
 2003: Audience Award
 2003: FIPRESCI Prize
Florida Film Festival
 2003: Special Jury Award - For documentary feature
International Documentary Association
 2003: IDA Award - Honorable Mention - Feature Documentaries
Sundance Film Festival
 2003: Audience Award - Documentary
 2003: Directing Award - Documentary

Nominations
International Documentary Association
 2003: IDA Award - Feature Documentaries
Sundance Film Festival
 2003: Grand Jury Prize - Documentary
Golden Trailer Awards
 2004: Golden Trailer - Best Documentary
Satellite Awards
 2004: Golden Satellite Award - Best Motion Picture, Documentary

See also
 Susan Tom

References

External links
 

2003 films
American documentary films
Documentary films about children with disability
Documentary films about adoption
Films set in the San Francisco Bay Area
Films shot in California
Films about cystic fibrosis
2000s English-language films
2000s American films